William Jeffrey Hopkins (1820–1901) was a British architect.

Career
One of Hopkins' earliest works, the Public Hall in Worcester (1848–49), was Italianate. Most of his work thereafter was of the Gothic Revival. For many years he was the Worcester Diocesan Architect, and as such he mostly built or rebuilt Church of England parish churches in Worcestershire.

Works
Public Hall, Worcester, 1848–49 (demolished circa 1968)
St. Martin's parish church, Worcester: east window, 1855–62
St. Barnabas' parish church, Drakes Broughton, Worcestershire, 1857
Cow Honeybourne parish church, Honeybourne, Worcestershire, 1861–63
Holy Trinity parish church, Shrub Hill, Worcester, 1863 (demolished 1965)
St. James' parish church, Hindlip, Worcestershire: rebuilding, 1864
St. John the Baptist parish church, Bradley, Worcestershire, 1864–65
St.Nicholas' parish church, Worcester: restoration, 1867
Saints Philip and James parish church, Hallow, Worcestershire, 1867–69
Bohun Court, Hallow, Worcestershire, 1860s (demolished 1925)
St. James' parish church, Churchill, Worcestershire, 1868
St. Peter ad Vincula parish church, Tibberton, Worcestershire, 1868
St. Paul's parish church, Blackheath, Birmingham, 1869
Bromsgrove School, Bromsgrove, Worcestershire: enlarged chapel, 1869
St. Mary's parish church, Icomb, Gloucestershire: restoration, 1871
St. Nicholas' parish church, King's Norton, Birmingham: restoration, 1871
St. Kenelm's parish church, Upper Snodsbury, Worcestershire:  rebuilt church, 1873–74
St. James' parish church, Norton-by-Kempsey: restoration (with Ewan Christian), 1874–75
St. John the Baptist parish church, Grafton Flyford, Worcestershire: rebuilding, 1875
St. John the Baptist parish church, Suckley, Worcestershire: rebuilt church, 1878–79
All Saints' parish church, Wilden, Worcestershire, 1880
St. Peter's parish church, Besford, Worcestershire: restoration, 1880–81
St. James' parish church, Kington, Worcestershire: rebuilt chancel, 1881
St. Eadburga's parish church, Abberton, Worcestershire, 1881–82
St. Peter's parish church, Flyford Flavell, Worcestershire: rebuilding, 1883
Saints Mathias and George parish church, Astwood Bank, Worcestershire, 1884
St. Bartholomew's parish church, Naunton Beauchamp, Worcestershire: rebuilding, 1897

References

Sources and further reading

1820 births
1901 deaths
Architects from Worcestershire
Gothic Revival architects
English ecclesiastical architects